Mohan Joshi is an Indian politician from Pune, Maharashtra. He represents the Indian National Congress in various organizational and constitutional 
capacities, including as head of the MPCC as state general secretary since 2009. He belongs to the Pune Constituency, Maharashtra. He is also chairman of the Tennikoit Federation of India and the President of Maharashtra State Branch of All India Harijan Sevak Sangh.

Early life

Born in Pune as an elder son of Smt. Jamnabai Joshi and Shri. Ramkishan Joshi, who initially took primary education at Shri Shivaji Maratha High School, Pune.

Social contribution
Joshi engages himself in various constructive programs and heading the "Harijan Sevak Sangh as President of Maharashtra state.

Joshi has also been associated with the Akhil Bharatiya Rachanatmak Samaj as the President which predominantly works in upliftment of destitute children and women in the society.

Mentoring hundreds of the sportspersons in the city as President of Pune Ring Tennis Association since last 20 years.

Political career
At initial a Journalist turned Youth Congress Activist.

 President of Pune Youth Congress-1972
 President of Maharashtra Youth Congress-1987
 He is President of Harijan Sevak Sangh Maharashtra.

It was under his leadership, all the elections held during 1997 to 2004 timeline, the Congress Party won all the elections for the Parliament, the State Assembly as well as the Pune Municipal Corporation. It is worth mentioning that the Congress Party won the Municipal corporation elections with a thumping majority under his leadership.

He also served as the Working President of Pune General Workers Union for many years uplifting and fighting the labor issues throughout.

Currently he is working as the advisor & honorary member of various Pune city-based trusts and voluntary organizations.

 Lok Sabha Elections in 1999 :

Joshi was Congress candidate for the Parliament elections from Pune constituency in 1999. It was a triangular fight between the Congress Party, the Nationalist Congress Party and the BJP. Strong division of votes were divided between Congress and Nationalist Congress Party, Mohan Joshi garnered  votes and secured the second position. The NCP candidate, who was the then sitting Member of Parliament, slid down to the third position.

 Lok Sabha elections 2004:

Congress & NCP had decided to contest the Parliament Elections in an alliance in 2004, Joshi had earned the claim for the Pune seat for Congress. He had also expressed the desire to contest from Pune Constituency. He was denied the nomination stating internal reasons. Mohan Joshi accepted the Party High Command's decision and worked relentlessly for party's candidate.

 Lok Sabha elections 2019:

Joshi is Congress Lok Sabha candidate from Pune constituency for the general elections of 2019. He will be taking over BJP's Girish Bapat as the main opposition candidate. Since 2014 BJP is ruling Pune Lok Sabha Constituency.

Joshi has been working as the General Secretary of Maharashtra Pradesh Congress Committee since 2005 and also, a member of the Executive Committee of the State Unit since 2009.

Joshi has been imparting the Social Responsibility under a unique initiative "Seva Kartavya Tyag" to mark the birth of Smt. Sonia Gandhi.

 Mohan Joshi also served as the chairman and Director of Shri Lakshmi Co-Operative Bank, Pune.
 Mohan Joshi also undertook various international study tours for the cause of peace, democracy and youth development.
 Under the leadership of a Gandhian Late Smt. Nirmaladidi Deshpande, Mohan Joshi visited Pakistan and participated in the "World Peace Conference".
 Mohan Joshi also attended an "International Youth Festival" held in Moscow, USSR in 1985. 
 Mohan Joshi was elected as the member of the prestigious Commonwealth Parliamentarian Association study-tour of Europe and UK in 2011.

Mark on governance
 Nominated Member of Legislative Council of Maharashtra. 
 He was the member of the panel of the Chairmen, of Maharashtra Legislative Council since 2010.
 He was the member of the Estimate Committee, Maharashtra Legislative Council from 2008 to 2010, and also on the Women's Rights and Welfare Committee 2008. 
 He was the Chairman of the Assurance Committee Maharashtra Legislative Council from 2011.
 Senate Member of Pune University

Controversies
Response to the religious chauvinism of the Vishwa Hindu Parishad, Mohan Joshi stormed into the VHP meeting and blackened the face of the extremist leader of VHP- Dr. Parvin Togadia.

References

People from Pune district
Indian National Congress politicians from Maharashtra
Members of the Maharashtra Legislative Council
Living people
1956 births
Indian male journalists